Ihor Mohylniy (born 4 October 1970) is a Ukrainian rower. He competed at the 1992 Summer Olympics and the 1996 Summer Olympics.

References

1970 births
Living people
Ukrainian male rowers
Olympic rowers of the Unified Team
Olympic rowers of Ukraine
Rowers at the 1992 Summer Olympics
Rowers at the 1996 Summer Olympics
Place of birth missing (living people)